Ectoedemia cerris is a moth of the family Nepticulidae. It is found from the Czech Republic and Slovakia to Italy and Greece.

The wingspan is 5–5.3 mm. Adults are on wing in May. There is one generation per year.

The larvae feed on Quercus cerris. They mine the leaves of their host plant. The mine consists of a narrow corridor, often running in the direction of the leaf margin. Then it either runs along a vein, or free, and then becomes contorted. The frass is concentrated in an interrupted central line. The corridor widens into a large blotch, where the frass is concentrated in the oldest part.

External links
Fauna Europaea
bladmineerders.nl
A Taxonomic Revision Of The Western Palaearctic Species Of The Subgenera Zimmermannia Hering And Ectoedemia Busck s.str. (Lepidoptera, Nepticulidae), With Notes On Their Phylogeny

Nepticulidae
Moths of Europe
Moths described in 1944